David Meyre is an associate professor in the Department of Clinical Epidemiology and Biostatistics at McMaster University, where he is also a Canada Research Chair in Genetics of Obesity. From September 2020, he starts teaching Molecular Biology in Nancy, France.

References

External links
Faculty page

Living people
Academic staff of McMaster University
Canadian geneticists
Obesity researchers
Human geneticists
Canada Research Chairs
Year of birth missing (living people)